Intervale may refer to:

A valley

Locations 
Intervale, New Hampshire, a village in the towns of Bartlett and Conway
Intervale, Virginia, a village in Allegheny County
Intervale (Augusta County, Virginia), a historic house
Intervale Avenue (IRT White Plains Road Line), a New York City Subway station
Intervale Factory, a historic factory building in Haverhill, Massachusetts